Momčilo Krajišnik (20 January 1945 – 15 September 2020) was a Bosnian Serb political leader, who along with Radovan Karadžić co-founded the Bosnian Serb nationalist Serb Democratic Party (SDS). Between 1990 and 1992, he was speaker of the People's Assembly of Republika Srpska. Between June and December 1992, Krajišnik also served as a member of the expanded Presidency of Republika Srpska. After the Bosnian War, he was elected Serb member of the tripartite Presidency of Bosnia and Herzegovina in the September 1996 election and served in that post from October 1996 until October 1998. He lost his bid for re-election in 1998 to Živko Radišić.

In 2006, Krajišnik was found guilty of committing crimes against humanity during the Bosnian War (1992–95) by the International Criminal Tribunal for the former Yugoslavia (ICTY) and was sentenced to 20 years in prison. He was later granted early release on 1 September 2013 and returned to Republika Srpska. Krajišnik died on 15 September 2020, in Banja Luka, as a result of complications caused by COVID-19.

Early life
An ethnic Serb, Krajišnik was born in Zabrđe, a village near Sarajevo in central Bosnia and Herzegovina.

Political developments in Bosnia leading to the war
On 15 October 1991, the parliament of SR Bosnia and Herzegovina passed a resolution on the sovereignty of Bosnia and Herzegovina, in spite of strong opposition from Bosnian Serb deputies. Ten days later, the Serb Democratic Party (SDS) formed a Bosnian Serb Assembly, with Momčilo Krajišnik acting as its president. The Bosnian Serb Assembly began establishing parallel government structures.

Participation in the Dayton negotiations
Krajišnik took part in the negotiations leading to the Dayton Agreement. He earned the nickname "Mr. No" for his uncompromising stance during negotiations. About that period, Richard Holbrooke noted in his memoirs:

Indictment by the ICTY and arrest

Krajišnik was indicted by the ICTY on various charges of crimes against humanity - namely extermination, murder, persecution, deportation, and forced transfer, murder as a war crime, and genocide - in relation to acts committed in 1992 in Bosnia and Herzegovina by Bosnian Serb forces. He was tracked by French intelligence special forces 13e RDP. He was arrested on 3 April 2000 at Pale by French SEALs Commando Hubert which were part of SFOR.

Conviction by the ICTY
On 27 September 2006 Krajišnik was convicted of the following crimes against humanity: extermination, murder, persecution, deportation, and forced transfer. He was acquitted of the charges of murder as a war crime, genocide, and complicity in genocide. He was sentenced to 27 years imprisonment.

ICTY judges found that Krajišnik had been part of a joint criminal enterprise which carried out the extermination, murder, persecution and deportation of non-Serbs during the Bosnian war between 1992 and 1995.

Judge Alphons Orie observed that "Krajišnik's role in the commission of the crimes was crucial ... His positions within the Bosnian Serb leadership gave him the authority to facilitate the military, police and paramilitary groups to implement the objective of the joint criminal enterprise". He noted "Mr Krajišnik... accepted that a heavy price of suffering, death and destruction was necessary to achieve Serb domination."

Krajišnik was acquitted of genocide or complicity in genocide on the grounds that the court had found no evidence of a genocidal intent on his part to destroy in full or part ethnic or religious communities. This decision was greeted with anger by representatives of victims of crimes of which Krajišnik had been found guilty, who found his acquittal on the charge of genocide difficult to accept. Bakira Hasečić of the Association of Women Victims of War, an organisation which campaigns for the prosecution of those responsible for the use of rape as a weapon of war that was a feature of the ethnic cleansing campaign, commented that "The sentence is a major blow to justice. It is an insult for the victims."

On 17 March 2009 the charges of murder and extermination were dropped and the sentence was reduced to 20 years. While the ICTY judges found that while there was evidence that crimes committed in Bosnia constituted the criminal act of genocide (actus reus), they did not establish that the accused possessed genocidal intent, or was part of a criminal enterprise that had such an intent (mens rea).

According to Edina Bećirević, both Krajišnik and Radovan Karadžić were warned by Bosnian Serb military commander General Ratko Mladić, also indicted on genocide charges, that their "plans"  could not be committed without committing genocide:

Imprisonment and release
In 2009, Krajišnik was transferred to the UK under the UK's enforcement agreements with the ICTY  to serve his sentence at HM Prison Belmarsh. In 2010, after a single year in prison, he filed a request for early release, which was rejected, as in practice the ICTY considers early release only after two thirds of the original sentence is served, unlike the UK where it is often considered after only half of the sentence is served.

In 2011, another request for early release was made, according to Krajišnik's brother, Mirko, in response to a British government initiative. Krajišnik said that the ICTY had received a proposal from the UK's Ministry of Justice that Momčilo Krajišnik, as a person serving a sentence in the UK, should apply for premature release based on the fact that he had served half his sentence. He had at that point been in prison both at The Hague and then in the UK since 3 April 2000.

On 1 September 2013, he was released from prison and went back to Republika Srpska after being granted early release by ICTY President Theodor Meron, having served two thirds of his 20 year sentence. After arriving in Banja Luka, a government helicopter flew him home to his wartime stronghold of Pale, where thousands of people welcomed him home. His supporters arrived by bus from across Republika Srpska and convoys of cars were on the streets of Pale with people waving Serbian flags, honking horns, and stopping at the main square as Serb nationalist songs were played. He then told reporters: "It's like a dream. You have no idea how beautiful this country is". He added that he was surprised by his welcome, as "after all, I am 'a war criminal'".

Death
On 29 August 2020, Krajišnik was taken to the Banja Luka hospital after it was confirmed that he tested positive for COVID-19, amid the COVID-19 pandemic in Bosnia and Herzegovina. The next day, on 30 August, his condition worsened and was put on a ventilator to help him breathe. Krajišnik died on 15 September 2020, in Banja Luka, as a result of complications caused by COVID-19.

References

External links

 BBC News Profile on Momčilo Krajišnik BBC News, 27 September 2006

1945 births
2020 deaths
Politicians from Sarajevo
Members of the Presidency of Bosnia and Herzegovina
Serbs of Bosnia and Herzegovina convicted of crimes against humanity
Politicians of the Bosnian War
Speakers of the National Assembly of Republika Srpska
People convicted by the International Criminal Tribunal for the former Yugoslavia
Serb Democratic Party (Bosnia and Herzegovina) politicians
Serbian nationalists
Heads of state convicted of war crimes
Heads of government who were later imprisoned
Deaths from the COVID-19 pandemic in Bosnia and Herzegovina
Serbian people convicted of murder